Xyphosia circinata is a species of tephritid or fruit flies in the genus Xyphosia of the family Tephritidae.

Distribution
Turkey, Caucasus.

References

Tephritinae
Insects described in 1869
Diptera of Europe
Diptera of Asia